"Living Inside Myself" is a song written and performed by Canadian singer-songwriter Gino Vannelli. It appears on his seventh album, Nightwalker. The song was produced by the three brothers Gino, Joe, and Ross Vannelli.

Premise and composition
In terms of the storyline, the song's narrator finds himself living inside both himself and "this hell" without his former love.  The main frame of the song is in B major, while the chorus progresses from A major to D flat.

Chart performance
Released as a single in 1981 in his native Canada, the song went to No. 13 on the RPM Top Singles chart and No. 2 on Canada's Adult Contemporary chart. and was his second top ten hit in the U.S. during the spring and summer of 1981, peaking at No. 6 on the Billboard Hot 100. "Living Inside Myself" reached No. 5 on the Billboard Adult Contemporary chart in the U.S.

Weekly singles charts

Year-end charts

Track listing
US 7" single
A. "Living Inside Myself" - 4:23
B. "Stay with Me" - 4:42

External links

References

1981 songs
1981 singles
Gino Vannelli songs
Arista Records singles
1980s ballads
Songs written by Gino Vannelli